Former Daniel A. Tompkins Company Machine Shop is a historic factory building located at Charlotte, Mecklenburg County, North Carolina. It was built in 1904–1905, and is a two-story, brick factory building with a rectangular plan and a small, one story ell. It was expanded in 1911 and an office section was added before 1929. The D.A. Tompkins Company was makers of textile machinery, supplies, and equipment.

It was added to the National Register of Historic Places in 2001.

References

Industrial buildings and structures on the National Register of Historic Places in North Carolina
Industrial buildings completed in 1905
Buildings and structures in Charlotte, North Carolina
National Register of Historic Places in Mecklenburg County, North Carolina
1905 establishments in North Carolina